The Baoji City Stadium Baoji, China.  It is currently used mostly for football matches.  The stadium holds 27,000 spectators.

References

External links
 Stadium information

Football venues in China
Sports venues in Shaanxi